James Irwin Brownson, Sr., D.D. (March 14, 1817 - 1899) was a clergyman and academic in Washington, Pennsylvania. He served as pastor of the First Presbyterian Church of Washington, Pennsylvania, for over 50 years.

Biography
He was born on March 14, 1817, in Mercersburg, Pennsylvania. He was ordained by the Presbytery of Carlisle in 1840. He became minister of the First Presbyterian Church of Washington, Pennsylvania, in 1848.

Brownson was elected to the board of trustees of Washington College in 1849 served as President Pro Tem. there from July 13, 1852, until September 20, 1853. He was elected to serve in the consolidated board of Washington & Jefferson College after the union of the two colleges and was made President of the Board in 1882. He again served as President Pro Tem. in 1870. He also served as a trustee of the Washington Female Seminary and of the Western Theological Seminary (now Pittsburgh Theological Seminary.

He died in 1899 in Washington, Pennsylvania.

Legacy
His son James Irwin Brownson, Jr. served as Judge of the Washington County Courts of Common Pleas and became the namesake of the Brownson House.

References

External links

Presidents of Washington & Jefferson College
Washington & Jefferson College alumni
19th-century Presbyterian ministers
American Presbyterian ministers
1817 births
1899 deaths
People from Mercersburg, Pennsylvania
19th-century American clergy